Hardwick or Hardwicke is a place in Bryan County, Georgia.  The town was laid out in 1754. Harwick was the county seat of Bryan County from 1793 through 1797.

References

External links
 "Dead Town" of Hardwicke historical marker

Geography of Bryan County, Georgia
Former county seats in Georgia (U.S. state)